Holmedal Church is a parish church of the Church of Norway in Kvinnherad Municipality in Vestland county, Norway. It is located in the village of Utåker. It is one of the three churches for the Husnes og Holmedal parish which is part of the Sunnhordland prosti (deanery) in the Diocese of Bjørgvin. The white, wooden church was built in a long church design in 1882 using plans drawn up by the architect F. Øvrevik. The church seats about 215 people.

History

The church has been around since the Middle Ages. The earliest existing historical records of the church date back to the year 1360, but it was not new at that time. The first church was a wooden stave church with a tower that was likely built during the 13th century. In both the 1600s and 1700s, major repairs were undertaken, including removing the tower. In 1724, the church was purchased from the Crown by Henrik H. Formann, the manager of the Lyse Abbey. The church was sold along with hundreds of other churches during the Norwegian church sale to raise money to pay down the debt from the Great Northern War.

By the early 1800s, the old church was in poor shape, so it was decided to tear down the old church and build a new one on the same site. In 1814, the old church was torn down and the owner at that time, Haktor Amundsen Tveit, paid to build a new church on the same site. The new church was a small rectangular church without a separate choir, no tower, and no sacristy. In 1866, the parish purchased the church back from private owners at a cost of 325 Norwegian speciedalers. After the church was constructed the local parish priest, P. Bøckmann complained that it "looks like a barn building and not like a church, it is a cramped house, has no chancel building, no tower, not even a marking that indicates it is God's house".

In 1882, the church was taken down, moved, and rebuilt using a new design by the local lensmann F. Øvrevik from Skånevik. The church was renovated for the 100th anniversary in 1982 under the direction of architect Magne Ivarsøy.

See also
List of churches in Bjørgvin

References

Kvinnherad
Churches in Vestland
Long churches in Norway
Wooden churches in Norway
19th-century Church of Norway church buildings
Churches completed in 1882
13th-century establishments in Norway